The 2010 Southern Conference men's basketball tournament took place March 5–8 in Charlotte, North Carolina. The first and quarterfinal rounds took place at Bojangles' Coliseum. The semifinals and championship game were played at Time Warner Cable Arena. The semifinals were broadcast on SportsSouth and the championship game was broadcast on ESPN2. The winner of the tournament, the Wofford Terriers, received an automatic bid to the 2010 NCAA Men's Division I Basketball Tournament.  It was Wofford's first appearance.

Bracket

Tiebreakers:

Chattanooga and UNC Greensboro split their season series.  Chattanooga was 1–1 against division leader Appalachian State, while UNC Greensboro was 0–2.

Samford swept the season series with Elon, 2–0.

All-Tournament Team
First Team
Kellen Brand, Appalachian State
Donald Sims, Appalachian State
Andrew Goudelock, College of Charleston
Noah Dahlman, Wofford
Jamar Diggs, Wofford

Second Team
Tony White, Jr., College of Charleston
Ben Stywall, UNC Greensboro
Harouna Mutombo, Western Carolina
Tim Johnson, Wofford
Cameron Rundles, Wofford

References

-2010 Southern Conference men's basketball tournament
Southern Conference men's basketball tournament
Southern Conference men's basketball tournament
Southern Conference men's basketball tournament
Basketball competitions in Charlotte, North Carolina
College sports tournaments in North Carolina
College basketball in North Carolina